The Prince Of Wales Stakes is a Perth Racing Group 3 Thoroughbred horse race held under weight for age conditions, for horses aged three years old and upwards, over a distance of 1000 metres at Ascot Racecourse, Perth, Western Australia in late October. Prize money is A$150,000.

History
Prior to 1997 the race was scheduled on Melbourne Cup Day. The race was moved for a period to early December. In 2003 the race was run at Belmont Park Racecourse.

Grade
1969–1978 - Principal race
1979 onwards - Group 3

Distance
1969–1972 - 6 furlongs (~1200 metres)
1973–2015 – 1200 metres
2016 onwards - 1000 metres

Winners

 2022 - Miss Conteki
 2021 - Elite Street
 2020 - Valour Road
 2019 - Flirtini
 2018 - Dainty Tess
 2017 - Dainty Tess
 2016 - Rock Magic
 2015 - Akhedasset
 2014 - Elite Belle
 2013 - Barakey
 2012 - Power Princess
 2011 - Waratah's Secret
 2010 - Waratah's Secret
 2009 - Idyllic Prince
 2008 - Dark Target
 2007 - Idyllic Prince
 2006 - Real Mak
 2005 - Miss Andretti
 2004 - Golden Delicious
 2003 - Kaprats
 2002 - Tribula
 2001 - Secret Remedy
 2000 - Secret Remedy
 1999 - Corporate Gun
 1998 - Double Blue
 1997 - Willoughby
 1996 - Century Blazer
 1995 - Century Blazer
 1994 - Jacks Or Better
 1993 - Daring Hombre
 1992 - Pago's King
 1991 - M'Lady's Jewel
 1990 - Mister Till
 1989 - Carry A Smile
 1988 - Fimiston
 1987 - Ossie Park
 1986 - Concrete
 1985 - Casshoney
 1984 - Heron Bridge
 1983 - Argentine Gold 
 1982 - I'm On Clover 
 1981 - Latin Saint 
 1980 - Golden Heights
 1979 - Asian Beau
 1978 - Junction Girl 
 1977 - Burgess Queen 
 1976 - Belinda's Star
 1975 - Belinda's Star
 1974 - Pocket Trim 
 1973 - Starglow
 1972 - Solid Gold 
 1971 - Heliolight 
 1970 - Red Crescent 
 1969 - Sherolythe

See also

 List of Australian Group races
 Group races

References

Horse races in Australia
Sport in Perth, Western Australia